Brahmanagudem is an Indian Railways station near Brahmanagudem, a village in West Godavari district of Andhra Pradesh. It lies on the Vijayawada–Visakhapatnam section and is administered under Vijayawada railway division of South Coast Railway zone. Ten trains halt in this station every day. It is the 3164th-busiest station in the country.

History
Between 1893 and 1896,  of the East Coast State Railway, between Vijayawada and BMGMttack was opened for traffic. The southern part of the West Coast State Railway (from Waltair to Vijayawada) was taken over by Madras Railway in 1901.

References

External links 

Railway stations in West Godavari district
Vijayawada railway division